Marie Schanzer von Bülow (1857–1941) was an Austrian-German stage and film actress. In July 1882, she married the pianist and conductor Hans von Bülow.

Selected filmography
 Vengeance Is Mine (1916)
 Wenn Frauen lieben und hassen (1917)
 Sein letzter Seitensprung (1918)
 Diary of a Lost Woman (1918)
 Eugen Onegin (1919)
 The Fairy of Saint Ménard (1919)
 Blonde Poison (1919)
 During My Apprenticeship (1919)
 The Boy in Blue (1919)
 Mazeppa, der Volksheld der Ukraine
 Monte Carlo (1921)
 Fridericus Rex (1922)
 Barmaid (1922)
 The Sun of St. Moritz (1923)

External links

1857 births
1941 deaths
German stage actresses
German film actresses
German silent film actresses
Austrian film actresses
Austrian silent film actresses
Austrian stage actresses
Actresses from Vienna
20th-century German actresses
20th-century Austrian actresses